Frederick C. Malkus Jr. (July 1, 1913 – November 9, 1999) was a Democratic state legislator from Maryland. He served in the Maryland House of Delegates from 1947 to 1951 and then Maryland State Senate until 1994. When he retired, he had served for 48 years, making him the longest serving legislator in the US. He never lost a re-election bid, though he did lose a 1973 congressional race to Republican Robert E. Bauman. In 1987, a new four-lane U.S. 50 bridge over the Choptank River, the Frederick C. Malkus Bridge, was named in his honor, the first bridge to be named for a living Marylander.

References

Democratic Party Maryland state senators
Democratic Party members of the Maryland House of Delegates
1913 births
1999 deaths
20th-century American politicians